Archbishop Kavukatt Jubilee Memorial School, abbreviated as AKJM Public School, is a private Catholic primary and secondary school located in Kanjirappally, Kottayam District, in the state of Kerala, India. The school was founded by the Society of Jesus in 1961 and follows the principles of Jesuit pedagogy. In spite of its abbreviated name as a public school, the school is not aided by government funding.

History
AKJM Public School was established by the Society of Jesus in 1961 in St. Dominic's Parish, Kanjirapally. English is the medium of instruction. The school was named in honour of Mar Matthew Kavukatt, Archbishop of Changanacherry in his sacerdotal jubilee year. It moved to its present site in 1963, serving primarily Catholic boys. A decade later a boarding house was opened. primarily for boys from the Kuttanad and High Range areas.

In 1995, with the increased population around the school, the boarding house was closed and AKJM Junior High was opened. In 2002 higher secondary was added for biology and science with maths. Also in 2002 the school began admitting girls. It has an active alumni association.

Activities 
Sponsored sports include basketball, volleyball, lawn tennis, badminton, football, hockey, cricket, taekwondo, and yoga, while facilities also include a horse riding ring and shooting range. Activities include music, instrumental music, painting, literary club, and table tennis.

Notable alumni 

 Bipin ChandranMalayalam script writer
 Reji Joseph PulluthuruthiyilIndian journalist
 Rishi SivakumarMalayalam film director

See also

 List of Jesuit schools
 List of schools in Kerala
 Violence against Christians in India

References 

Jesuit primary schools in India
Christian schools in Kerala
Primary schools in Kerala
High schools and secondary schools in Kerala
Schools in Kottayam district
Educational institutions established in 1961
1961 establishments in Kerala
Jesuit secondary schools in India